Mohammadiabad (also Romanized as Moḩammadīābād) is a village in Jam Rural District, in the Central District of Jam County, Bushehr Province, Iran. At the 2006 census, its population was 159, in 43 families.

References 

Populated places in Jam County